Repatriation is a 2004 South Korean documentary film that documents the lives of unconverted long-term prisoners imprisoned in the South for more than 30 years. They were finally set free in the 1990s when inter-Korean relations improved, and repatriated to the North.

It was presented with the Freedom of Expression Award at the 2004 Sundance Film Festival, the first time a Korean film has ever been presented with an award at the prestigious U.S. festival. It also won Best Documentary Award at the 19th Fribourg International Film Festival in 2005.

Production

When the unconverted long-term prisoners imprisoned in South Korea, were released after more than 30 years, they moved to Bongchun-dong, filmmaker Kim Dong-won's village.

Awards and nominations

References

External links 
 
 

2004 films
2000s Korean-language films
South Korean documentary films
Films directed by Kim Dong-won
2004 documentary films
2000s South Korean films